Immediate Payment Service (IMPS) is an instant payment inter-bank  electronic funds transfer system in India. IMPS offers an inter-bank electronic fund transfer service through mobile phones. The service is available 24x7 throughout the year including bank holidays. NEFT was also made available 24x7 from December 2019. RTGS was also made available 24x7 from 14th December 2020. 

It is managed by the National Payments Corporation of India (NPCI) and is built upon the existing National Financial Switch network. In 2010, the NPCI initially carried out a pilot for the mobile payment system with 4 member banks (State Bank of India, Bank of India, Union Bank of India and ICICI Bank), and expanded it to include Yes Bank, Axis Bank and HDFC Bank later that year. IMPS was publicly launched on 22 November 2010. Currently, there are 53 commercial banks, 101 Rural/District/Urban and cooperative banks, and 24 PPIi signed up for the IMPS service. 

The sender requires to know the bank account number and the Indian Financial System Code of the beneficiary to transfer money.

See also

 Payment and settlement systems in India
 Prepaid Payment Instruments in India
 National Electronic Fund Transfer
 Real Time Gross Settlement
 Unified Payments Interface

References

External Links
 

Payment networks
Interbank networks in India
Banking in India
Mobile payments in India
Payment and settlement systems in India